The IMOCA 60 Class yacht Galileo, BRA 411 was designed by Angelo Lavranos and Artech Design Team launched in June 2005 and built by Artech do Brasil.

Racing Results

References 

Individual sailing vessels
2000s sailing yachts
Vendée Globe boats
IMOCA 60